The 1941 New South Wales state election was for 90 electoral districts each returning a single member with compulsory preferential voting.

Results by electoral district

Albury

Annandale 

 Preferences were not distributed.

Armidale

Ashburnham

Ashfield

Auburn

Balmain 

 Preferences were not distributed.

Bankstown 

 Preferences were not distributed.

Barwon

Bathurst

Blacktown

Bondi

Botany

Bulli

Burwood

Byron

Canterbury 

 Preferences were not distributed.

Casino

Castlereagh 

The sitting member for Castlereagh, Alfred Yeo (Country), was concerned that the redistribution had made it a Labor seat and he unsuccessfully contested Liverpool Plains.

Cessnock

Clarence

Cobar

Concord

Coogee

Cook's River

Corowa

Croydon

Drummoyne

Dubbo

Dulwich Hill

Georges River

Gloucester

Gordon

Goulburn

Granville

Hamilton

Hartley

Hawkesbury

Hornsby

Hurstville

Illawarra

King

Kogarah

Kurri Kurri

Lachlan

Lakemba 

 Preferences were not distributed.

Lane Cove

Leichhardt

Lismore

Liverpool Plains 

 Preferences were not distributed.

The sitting member Harry Carter (Country) retired. Alfred Yeo (Country) was the sitting member for Castlereagh.

Maitland

Manly

Marrickville

Monaro

Mosman 

 Preferences were not distributed.

Mudgee

Murray

Murrumbidgee

Namoi

Nepean

Neutral Bay

Newcastle 

 Preferences were not distributed.

Newtown 

 Preferences were not distributed.

North Sydney

Orange

Oxley

Paddington

Parramatta

Phillip 

 Preferences were not distributed.

Raleigh

Randwick 

 Preferences were not distributed.

Redfern

Rockdale 

 Preferences were not distributed.

Ryde 

Arthur Williams won the seat at the 1940 by-election, but after the re-distribution, chose to contest [[Results of the 1941 New South Wales state election#Georges River|Georges River]] instead and Labor did not field a candidate. Eric Solomon was the  member for the abolished seat of Petersham. James Shand was the  member for the abolished seat of Hornsby and had been denied pre-selection.

South Coast

Sturt

Tamworth 

|- style="background-color:#E9E9E9"
! colspan="6" style="text-align:left;" |After distribution of preferences

 Preferences were not distributed to completion.

Temora

Tenterfield

Upper Hunter

Vaucluse

Wagga Wagga

Waratah

Waverley 

 Preferences were not distributed.

Willoughby

Wollondilly

Wollongong-Kembla

Woollahra

Yass

Young

See also 
 Candidates of the 1941 New South Wales state election
 Members of the New South Wales Legislative Assembly, 1941–1944

Notes

References 

1941